Rob Lohr (born March 1, 1990) is an American football defensive tackle who is currently a free agent. He played college football at Vanderbilt University and attended Phoenixville Area High School in Phoenixville, Pennsylvania. He has been a member of the Kansas City Chiefs and BC Lions.

Early years
Lohr played high school football for the Phoenixville Area High School Phantoms. He was a three-year starter at tight end and defensive end. He was team MVP his senior year, helping the Phantoms to 8–4 record and the AAA state playoffs. Lohr was named Pioneer Conference Defensive Player of the Year and All-Southeastern Pennsylvania team by "Philadelphia Inquirer". He recorded 65 tackles and 15 sacks as a senior at defensive end. He also recorded  in 26 catches for 609 yards and five touchdowns at tight end. He was nominated to play in the Pennsylvania East-West Game.

College career
Lohr played for the Vanderbilt Commodores from 2008 to 2012.

Professional career

Kansas City Chiefs
Lohr was signed by the Kansas City Chiefs on May 1, 2013, after going undrafted in the 2013 NFL Draft. He was released by the Chiefs on August 25, 2013.

BC Lions
Lohr signed with the BC Lions on May 21, 2014.

References

External links
NFL Draft Scout
BC Lions profile

Living people
1990 births
Players of American football from Pennsylvania
American football defensive linemen
Canadian football defensive linemen
American players of Canadian football
Vanderbilt Commodores football players
BC Lions players
People from Phoenixville, Pennsylvania